The 1989 France rugby union tour of New Zealand was a series of eight matches played in June and July 1989 by the France national rugby union team in New Zealand. The team won four matches and lost four, including defeats to provincial teams Southland and Wellington. France lost both matches of the two-match test series against the New Zealand national rugby union team.

Results
Scores and results list France's points tally first.

Touring party

Manager: Jacques Fouroux
Assistant manager: Henri Fourès
Captain:  Pierre Berbizier

Full backs
 Serge Blanco

Three-quarters
 Philippe Sella
 Franck Mesnel
 Patrice Lagisquet
 Stéphane Weller
 Philippe Bérot
 Peyo Hontas
 Jean-Baptiste Lafond
 Denis Charvet
 Marc Andrieu

Half-backs
 Philippe Rougé-Thomas
 Pierre Berbizier
 Henri Sanz
 Jean-Marc Lescure

Forwards
 Philippe Gallart
 Marc Pujolle
 Dominique Bouet
 Jean Condom
 Dominique Erbani
 Alain Carminati
 Olivier Roumat
 Laurent Rodriguez
 Thierry Devergie
 Philippe Benetton
 Jean-François Tordo
 Herve Chabowski
 Jean-Pierre Garuet-Lempirou
 Pascal Beraud
 Pascal Ondarts

France tour
France rugby
1989
Rugby union tours of New Zealand
France national rugby union team tours
tour